Sisterdale is an unincorporated farming and ranching community established in 1847 and located  north of Boerne in Kendall County, in the U.S. state of Texas. The community is located in the valley of Sister Creek.

Community
Sisterdale was settled in 1847 by German surveyor and free thinker Nicolaus Zink. Originally part of Comal County, Sisterdale became part of Kendall County when the latter was formed in 1862.

Among the settlers were German pioneers Fritz and Betty Holekamp, geographer Ernst Kapp; Anhalt Premier progeny Baron Ottomar von Behr; journalist Carl Adolph Douai; August Siemering who later founded the San Antonio Express News; author, journalist and diplomat Julius Fröbel; future Wall Street financial wizard Gustav Theissen; and Edgar von Westphalen, brother to Jenny von Westphalen who was married to Karl Marx.

The first child born in Sisterdale (and in Kendall County) was Julius Holekamp on June 10, 1849, to Fritz and Betty Holekamp.

One notable early colonist was Edward Degener, future Republican congressman from Texas during the Reconstruction era. Degener's sons Hugo and Hilmar died during the American Civil War in the Nueces massacre. To honor their memory, Degener along with Eduard Steves and William Heuermann purchased land for the establishment of the German-language Treue der Union Monument, which was built in 1866 and listed on the National Register of Historic Places in 1978.

Also among the settlers was Julius Dresel (or Dressel), a member of the German Chambers of Deputies, who was the first to plant a Sisterdale vineyard. His brother Emil Dresel and partner Jacob Gundlach later established the Rhein Farm Vineyard in Sonoma, California. Julius later moved to San Antonio. Upon the death of brother Emil, who bequeathed Julius his share of the Sonoma vineyard, Julius moved his family to California.

The community received a post office in 1851, and Ottomar W. Behr was the first postmaster.

Sisterdale eventually had a school house, a gas station-garage, a general store, a cotton gin, and a factory for making cypress shingles. The old 1885 cotton gin in Sisterdale has been restored and is today home to Sister Creek Vineyards.

Historical population

Source: Texas Escapes

Free thinkers
Sisterdale was one of the Latin Settlements, resulting from the Revolutions of 1848 in the German states. Those who came were Forty-Eighters, intellectual liberal abolitionists who enjoyed conversing in Latin and believed in utopian ideals that guaranteed basic human rights to all. They reveled in passionate conversations about literature, music and philosophy.

The free thinkers petitioned the Texas Legislature in 1853 for a charter to operate a German-English college to be built at Sisterdale, but the petition did not come to fruition.

Irene Marschall King, granddaughter of John O. Meusebach, remembered how her grandfather enjoyed the intellectual stimulation of visits to Sisterdale, where a man of his aristocratic background could relate to such cultured free thought discourse, and where the air filled with concert music, singing, dancing and an ambience of general Gemütlichkeit.

In 1853, August Siemering was elected secretary, and Ernst Kapp the president, of the freethinker abolitionist organization  (The Free Society), which called for a meeting of abolitionist German Texans in conjunction with the May 14, 1854, Staats-Saengerfest (State Singing Festival) in San Antonio. Wilhelm Victor Keidel was elected vice president of the convention, which adopted a political, social and religious platform, including:

1) Equal pay for equal work; 2) Direct election of the President of the United States; 3) Abolition of capital punishment; 4)  Slavery is an evil, the abolition of which is a requirement of democratic principles...; 5) Free schools – including universities – supported by the state, without religious influence; and 6) Total separation of church and state.

One of the most tragic episodes in the history of Kendall County happened in 1862 after Texas joined the Confederacy. The Confederacy considered the free thinkers of Sisterdale and like communities to be a threat. A number of Kendall County Germans became conscientious objectors to the military draft. Confederate authorities reacted by imposing martial law on central Texas. 61 conscientious objectors attempted to flee to Mexico. Confederate irregular James Duff and his Duff's Partisan Rangers pursued them. At the Nueces River, 34 were killed, and some executed after being taken prisoner. In 1866, Kendall County erected the Treue der Union Monument ("Loyalty to the Union") monument dedicated to the German Texans slain at the Nueces massacre.

Darmstadt Society of Forty
Some of the early settlers in Sisterdale migrated from the collapsed Fisher–Miller Land Grant experimental colonies of the Darmstadt Society of Forty.

Sisterdale Valley District

The Sisterdale Valley District is a  historic district in Sisterdale, Texas that was listed on the U.S. National Register of Historic Places  in 1975. It included 15 contributing buildings and six other contributing structures.  The historic buildings include an 1890s dance hall.

Various sources discuss Sisterdale.

Photo gallery

See also

Fredericksburg, Texas
German Texan
Grapetown, Texas
Crabapple, Texas
Texas Hill Country
National Register of Historic Places listings in Kendall County, Texas

References

Further reading

External links

 Kendall County official website
 Sisterdale Creek Vineyards

Unincorporated communities in Texas
German-American history
German-American culture in Texas
Populated places established in 1847
Freethought in the United States
Latin Settlement
Unincorporated communities in Kendall County, Texas
Historic districts on the National Register of Historic Places in Texas
1847 establishments in Texas
National Register of Historic Places in Kendall County, Texas